Year 1546 (MDXLVI) was a common year starting on Friday (link will display the full calendar) of the Julian calendar.

Events 
 January–June 
 May 19 – The Siege of Kawagoe Castle ends in defeat for the Uesugi clan, in their attempt to regain Kawagoe Castle from the Late Hōjō clan in Japan. 
 June 7 – The Treaty of Ardres (also known as the Treaty of Camp) is signed, resulting in peace between the kingdoms of England and France, ending the Italian War of 1542–1546.

 July–December 
 July 10 – The Schmalkaldic War, a political struggle between imperial forces under Charles V, Holy Roman Emperor, and the Lutheran forces of the Schmalkaldic League, begins.
 November 4 – Christ Church, Oxford, is refounded as a college by Henry VIII of England under this name.
 December 19 – Trinity College, Cambridge, is founded by Henry VIII of England.

 Date unknown 
 Katharina von Bora flees to Magdeburg.
 Michelangelo is made chief architect of St. Peter's Basilica in Rome.
 The Spanish conquest of Yucatán is completed.

Births 

 January 27 – Joachim Friedrich, Elector of Brandenburg (d. 1608)
 February 1 – Mogami Yoshiaki, Japanese daimyō of the Yamagata domain (d. 1614)
 February 4 – Jakob Monau, Polish writer and linguist (d. 1603)
 February 14 – Johann Pistorius, German historian (d. 1608)
 March 16 – Francesco Barbaro, Italian diplomat (d. 1616)
 March 21 – Bartholomeus Spranger, Flemish painter (d. 1611)
 March 25 – Giacomo Castelvetro, Italian writer (d. 1616)
 March 27 – Johannes Piscator, German theologian (d. 1625)
 March 29 – Anne d'Escars de Givry, French Catholic cardinal (d. 1612)
 April 1 – Nanbu Nobunao, Japanese daimyō (d. 1599)
 April 20 – Bernardo de Sandoval y Rojas, Spanish Catholic cardinal (d. 1618)
 June 13 – Tobias Matthew, English Archbishop of York (d. 1628)
 June 14 – Wolfgang, Count of Hohenlohe-Weikersheim, German count (d. 1610)
 June 24 – Robert Parsons, English Jesuit priest (d. 1610)
 June 29 – Dorothea of Denmark, Duchess of Brunswick-Lüneburg (1561-1592) (d. 1617)
 July 4 – Murat III, Ottoman Sultan (d. 1595)
 August 10 – Juliana of Nassau-Dillenburg, Dutch prince (d. 1588)
 August 13 – Jan Opaliński, Polish nobleman and Castellan of Rogozin (d. 1598)
 August 31 – Daniel Adam z Veleslavína, Czech lexicographer (d. 1599)
 September 6 – Pedro Álvarez de Toledo, 5th Marquis of Villafranca, Spanish noble and politician (d. 1627)
 September 11 – Arild Huitfeldt, Danish historian (d. 1609)
 September 13 – Isabella Bendidio, Italian singer and noble in Renaissance court of Ferrara (d. 1610)
 October 5 – Rudolph Snellius, Dutch linguist and mathematician (d. 1613)
 November 11 – Richard Madox, English explorer (d. 1583)
 December 14 – Tycho Brahe, Danish astronomer (d. 1601)
 date unknown
 Luca Bati, Italian Baroque composer (d. 1608)
 Thomas Digges, English astronomer (d. 1595)
 Veronica Franco, Venetian poet and courtesan (died 1591)
 Takeda Katsuyori, Japanese nobleman (d. 1582)
 Mikołaj VII Radziwiłł, Polish magnate (d. 1565)
 probable – Lodewijk Elzevir, Dutch printer (d. 1617)

Deaths 

 January 11 
 Ernest I, Duke of Brunswick-Lüneburg (b. 1497)
 Gaudenzio Ferrari, Italian painter and sculptor (b. c. 1471)
 February 18 – Martin Luther, German religious reformer (b. 1483)
 February 23 – Francis, Count of Enghien, French military leader (b. 1519)
 March 1 – George Wishart, Scottish religious reformer (martyred) (b. 1513)
 March 26 – Thomas Elyot, English diplomat and scholar (b. c. 1490)
 April 7 – Friedrich Myconius, German Lutheran theologian (b. 1491)
 May 17 – Philipp von Hutten, German explorer (b. 1511)
 May 28 – Ottaviano de' Medici, Italian politician (b. 1484)
 May 29 – David Beaton, Scottish Catholic cardinal (assassinated) (b. c. 1494)
 June 13 – Fridolin Sicher, Swiss composer (b. 1490)
 July 4 – Khair ad Din "Barbarossa", corsair ruler of Algiers (b. 1475)
 July 9 – Robert Maxwell, 5th Lord Maxwell, Scottish statesman (b. c. 1493)
 July 16 – Anne Askew, English Protestant (burned at the stake) (b. 1521)
 August 1 – Peter Faber, French Jesuit theologian (b. 1506)
 August 3
 Étienne Dolet, French scholar and printer (b. 1509)
 Antonio da Sangallo the Younger, Italian architect (b. 1484)
 August 12 – Francisco de Vitoria, Renaissance theologian (b. 1492)
 November 1 – Giulio Romano, Italian painter (b. 1499)

References